The 2nd Infantry Division (2-ya Pekhotnaya Diviziya) was an infantry unit of the Russian Imperial Army that existed in various formations from 1806 until the end of World War I and the Russian Revolution. The division fought in the Russo-Turkish War of 1877–78 and World War I.

History 
Formed in 1806 as the 5th Infantry Division, it was renumbered as the 2nd in 1820.

The division took part in the Russo-Turkish War of 1877-78, during which it participated in the battles of Łowicz and Plevna. During 1902 and 1903, Anton Denikin served as an adjutant with the division's staff. Anatoly Stessel briefly commanded the division between May and August 1903. From at least 1903 to 1913 it was based in Brest-Litovsk and later in Novogeorgievsk.

It later fought in World War I. The division fought in the Battle of Tannenberg in late August 1914, under the command of Alexander Dushkevich. On 26 August, the 7th Revel Infantry Regiment of its 2nd Brigade suffered losses of 3,000 men, three-quarters of its strength, and was wiped out as a combat unit. The division was split in half and retreated in disorder. On the next day it was again attacked by the German 37th Infantry Division and "collapsed", retreating to Neidenburg. Dushkevich replaced Leonid Artamonov in command of the 1st Army Corps on 28 August after the latter was relieved of command.

Organization 
Russian infantry divisions consisted of a staff, two infantry brigades, and one artillery brigade. The 2nd Infantry Division was part of the 23rd Army Corps as of 1914.
1st Brigade
 5th Emperor William I's Kaluga Infantry Regiment
 6th Prince Frederik-Leopold's Libau Infantry Regiment
2nd Brigade
 7th Revel Infantry Regiment
 8th Estonian Infantry Regiment
2nd Artillery Brigade

Notable leaders
Yevgeny Golovin 1831–1834
Alexander Imeretinsky 1877
Anatoly Stessel 1903

References 

Infantry divisions of the Russian Empire
Military units and formations established in 1806
Military units and formations disestablished in 1918